George Wolstenholme Hicks (30 April 1902 – 21 February 1954) was an English professional footballer who played as an outside left. He made 231 appearances in the Football League playing for  Manchester City, Birmingham, Swindon Town and Rotherham United.

Life and career
Hicks was born in Salford in 1902. He played youth football with Salford Lads' Club before joining Manchester-based Clayton and then Droylsden, from where he signed for Manchester City in November 1923. He played for City in the 1926 FA Cup Final and contributed to them winning the Second Division championship in the 1927–28 season. He signed for First Division club Birmingham in October 1928, and scored 12 league goals in what remained of that season. Early in the 1930–31 season he sustained a serious knee injury. Though he attempted a comeback twelve months later, playing and scoring against Blackpool in September 1931, that game marked the end of his Birmingham career. He moved to Manchester United in January 1932, but left for Bristol Rovers later that year without having featured for the first team. A further year later, again without playing League football, he joined Swindon Town, for whom he played four matches before moving to his last Football League club, Rotherham United, where he missed only three games in the remainder of the 1933–34 season. He went on play non-league football for Manchester North End, Lancaster Town, CWS Vere Street Works, and a further spell with Droylsden.

Hicks died in Worsley, Lancashire, on 21 February 1954 at the age of 51.

Notes

References

1902 births
1954 deaths
Footballers from Salford
English footballers
Association football outside forwards
Droylsden F.C. players
Manchester City F.C. players
Birmingham City F.C. players
Manchester United F.C. players
Bristol Rovers F.C. players
Swindon Town F.C. players
Rotherham United F.C. players
Manchester North End F.C. players
Lancaster City F.C. players
English Football League players
FA Cup Final players